24 Hour Karate School is the debut album by hip hop record producer, Ski Beatz. Originally, the album was set for a March 30, 2010 but was pushed back due to sample clearance issues. The project was then given a September 7, 2010 release date, however, was not released until September 21. Guest appearances featured consists of Curren$y, Jim Jones, Jay Electronica, Joell Ortiz, Jean Grae, Wiz Khalifa, Stalley and Camp Lo. Mos Def was also scheduled to appear on the album, but was removed due to clearance issues.

Promotion
Several videos were shot for the album promotion and can be found at Creative Control and at the home page of Damon Dash's DD172. The first official single released for the album was titled, "Nothing But Us", features labelmate Curren$y and Harlem-based rapper, Smoke DZA. The single was released on August 31, 2010. A video for the single was also released.

Track listing

References

External links
 Official album site

2010 albums
Albums produced by Ski Beatz